Kim Min-jun (born 12 January 1996) is a South Korean former footballer.

Career statistics

Club

Notes

References

1996 births
Living people
South Korean footballers
Association football forwards
K League 2 players
FC Seoul players
Gyeongnam FC players